Ramón Álvarez-Valdés (1866, Pola de Siero – 23 August 1936) was a Spanish politician and lawyer.

He was Minister of Justice of during the Second Spanish Republic between 16 December 1933 and 17 April 1934 under the presidency of Alejandro Lerroux. He was arrested after the military revolt of 18 July 1936 in the Spanish Civil War and jailed and was killed about a month later.

1866 births
1936 deaths
People from Siero
Reformist Party (Spain) politicians
Justice ministers of Spain
Members of the Congress of Deputies of the Spanish Restoration
Members of the Congress of Deputies of the Second Spanish Republic
Politicians from Asturias
20th-century Spanish lawyers
Assassinated Spanish politicians
Politicians killed in the Spanish Civil War
People murdered in Spain
Spanish people who died in prison custody
Prisoners who died in Spanish detention
19th-century Spanish lawyers